The International Corrections and Prisons Association (ICPA) is a not-for-profit association for prison professionals, based in Brussels, Belgium.
The current president is Peter Severin from Australia. It hosts an annual conference in a different city each year.

A previous president was Peter van der Sande.

ICPA is a non-governmental organization in Special Consultative Status with the Economic and Social Council of the United Nations (ECOSOC). ICPA was founded in 1998.

To recognize outstanding progress and excellence with respect to the mission of the ICPA (particularly achievements which advance humanitarian approaches and advance professional corrections), the ICPA established an annual awards program.

2014

{| class="wikitable"
!Award
!Recipient
!Organisation
!Country 
!In recognition of
|-
||Offender Management and Reintegration Award||Wayne Brian & John Rougier ||Vision on Mission||Trinidad & Tobago || Aftercare program.
|-
||Management and Staff Training Award||Craig Howard||Corrections Victoria||Australia||The Corrections Victoria Intelligence Model.
|-
||Correctional Healthcare Award||Dej Prison Hospital||National Administration of Prisons||Romania||
|-
||Research Award||Toon Molleman||WODC||Netherlands||
|-
||Outstanding Correctional Staff Member||Patience Kake||Namibian Correctional Service||Namibia||
|-
||Outstanding Contribution to the Association||Don Stolworthy||||United States||
|-
||President's Award||International Centre for Prison Studies||||United Kingdom||
|-
|}

2015

{| class="wikitable"
!Award
!Recipient
!Organisation
!Country 
!In recognition of
|-
||Offender Management and Reintegration Award||Gobierno del Estado de Chihiuahua||Gobierno del Estado de Chihiuahua||Mexico|| Prison System Transformation.
|-
||Management and Staff Training Award||Joseph J. Marchese||||USA||Initiatives in Security and Correctional Emergency Preparedness.
|-
||Correctional Healthcare Award||Rwanda Correctional Service||Rwanda Correctional Service||Rwanda||
|-
||Community Corrections Award||Dr James Bonta||Department of Public Safety||Canada||Strategic Training Initiative in Community Supervision.
|-
||Research Award||Dr Elizabeth Grant||The University of Adelaide||Australia||Prison Design for Indigenous People.
|-
||Outstanding Correctional Service Employee||James Bulger||||Australia||Leadership during delivery of HCC Expansion Project.
|-
||Outstanding Correctional Service Employee||Anne Hooker||G4S||Australia||Youth Unit, Port Phillip Prison
|-
||Head of Service Award||Nils Öberg||Swedish Prison and Probation Service||Sweden||International Cooperation Initiatives
|-
||President's Award||Denise Robinson||Alvis House||United States||Advancing Corrections at Alvis House
|-
|}

2016

{| class="wikitable"
!Award
!Recipient
!Organisation
!Country 
!In recognition of
|-
||Offender Management and Reintegration Award||Israel Prison Service||Israel Prison Service||Israel|| The Road to Freedom Project.
|-
||Management and Staff Training Award||Kenya Prisons Service & 
Raoul Wallenberg Institute
|Kenya Prisons Service & 
Raoul Wallenberg Institute
|Kenya||Human Rights Officers Project
|-
||Correctional Healthcare Award||Hong Kong Correctional 
Services Department
|Hong Kong Correctional Services Department||Hong Kong||The Three –Tier Medical Respond System
|-
||Community Corrections Award||Jason Hainsworth||New South Wales||Australia||Practical Guide for Community Workers.
|-
||Research Award||Dr. Andrea Moser||Correctional Service of Canada||Canada||Her tremendous contribution to humane and effective 
correctional policies and practices.
|-
||Outstanding Correctional Service Employee||Amado Aquino Concepcion Jr.||Bureau of Jail Management and Penology||Philippines||His lead in the Jail transformation through humane safekeeping
and structural systems innovations.
|-
||Outstanding Correctional Service Employee||Roman Marius Gheorghiță||National Administration of Penitentiaries||Romania||His strong leadership during two major prisons’ incidents and for 
his exceptional training skills in self defense and tactical technique.
|-
||Outstanding Contribution Award||Dr. Frank Porporino||||Canada||Outstanding contribution to ICPA
|-
||Head of Service Award||Peter Hennephof||Dutch Custodial Institutions Agency||Netherlands||His efforts and for his interest in engaging in international prison
and probation collaborations.
|-
||President's Award||International Committee 
of the Red Cross
|International Committee of the Red Cross||Switzerland||Their great work in detention over the years and their continuous 
efforts to make improvements in corrections approaches.
|-
|}

References

External links
 
 About ICPA

Prison-related organizations
Professional associations based in Belgium
International organisations based in Belgium
Organizations established in 1998
Prison officer organisations